Dudley Perkins is an American rapper and singer from Oxnard, California. He has released records on Stones Throw Records under his own name and the alias of Declaime. In 2008, he co-founded the SomeOthaShip Connect record label with his partner Georgia Anne Muldrow.

Life and career
Having begun rapping in 1987, he was featured on The Alkaholiks' 1995 album Coast II Coast under the Declaime moniker. In 2001, he released Andsoitisaid, his first album as Declaime.

Dudley Perkins released A Lil' Light, an album entirely produced by Madlib, on Stones Throw Records in 2003. His second album as Dudley Perkins, titled Expressions (2012 A.U.), was released in 2006. In 2009, he released Holy Smokes, which was entirely produced by Georgia Anne Muldrow. In 2013, he released Dr. Stokley on Mello Music Group.

Discography

Studio albums
 Andsoitisaid (2001) 
 A Lil' Light (2003)
 Conversations with Dudley (2004) 
 It's the Dank & Jammy Show (2005) 
 Expressions (2012 A.U.) (2006)
 The Message Uni Versa (2007) 
 Astormsacomin''' (2008) 
 Muzikillmind (2009) 
 Holy Smokes (2009)
 Fonk (2010) 
 SomeOthaShip (2010) 
 Dr. Shrooman AKA Black Tripper (2010)
 Self Study (2011) 
 Dr. Stokley (2013)
 The Lighthouse (2013) 
 Southside Story (2015) 
 Young Spirit (2017) 
 In the Beginning, Vol. 1 (2021) 
 In the Beginning, Vol. 2 (2022) 
 Flying High (2022) 
 In the Beginning, Vol. 3 (2023) 

Mixtapes
 Beautiful Mindz (2008) 

EPs
 Illmindmuzik (1999) 
 Mad Men on Arrival (2003) 
 The Godfather EP (2006) 
 Heaven or Hell (2010) 

Singles
 "Never Ending" (2000) 
 "Move It" (2001) 
 "Exclaim the Name" (2001) 
 "Flowers" (2001)
 "Caliwayz (Remix)" (2002) 
 "Still Waters" / "Always Complete" (2002)
 "Enjoy Your Stay" / "Life" (2003) 
 "Money" (2003)
 "Heavenbound" (2004) 
 "Dearest Desiree" (2004) 
 "Washedbrainsyndrome" (2004)
 "Funky Dudley" / "Testin' Me" (2006)
 "Come Here My Dear" / "All for You" (2006)
"Peace Pipe" (2006) 
 "Whole Wide World" (2009) 
 "Popstopper" (2013) 

Guest appearances
 Tha Alkaholiks – "WLIX" from Coast II Coast (1995)
 Lootpack – "Break Dat Party" and "Episodes" from Soundpieces: Da Antidote (1999)
 Kan Kick – "Love Hardcore (Underground)" and "Toast to the Boogie" from From Artz Unknown (2001)
 Mums the Word – "Say It" from People Keep Movin' (2002)
 Wildchild – "All Night" from The Jackal (2004)
 Oh No – "Green Tree" from The Disrupt (2004)
 MED – "Now U Know" from Push Comes to Shove (2005)
 Oh No – "T. Biggums" from Exodus into Unheard Rhythms (2006)
 The Tongue – "Animal Crackers" from Shock and Awe (2007)
 Kraak & Smaak – "That's My Word" from That's Our Word (2008)
 Jazz Liberatorz – "Music Makes the World Go Round" from Fruit of the Past (2009)
 Electric Wire Hustle – "Jupiter" from Electric Wire Hustle (2009)
 Oddisee – "Get Up" from Mental Liberation (2009)
 Apollo Brown – "Ghetto Soul Music" from The Reset (2010)
 Paper Tiger – "Worldwide Takeover" from Worldwide Takeover EP (2011)
 Jai Nitai Lotus – "Hard Times and Bless" from Something You Feel (2012)
 Oh No – "Improvement" from Disrupted Ads (2013)
 Georgia Anne Muldrow – "Dollar" from Ms. One (2014)
 Georgia Anne Muldrow – "The Outcome" and "Gitdown" from A Thoughtiverse Unmarred (2015)
 J-Zen – "God Music" from Managua (2015)
 Superior – "Entire Empire" from Scenes'' (2015)

References

External links
 

American hip hop singers
African-American rappers
Good Vibe Recordings artists
Year of birth missing (living people)
Stones Throw Records artists
Living people
Musicians from Oxnard, California
Rappers from California
Songwriters from California
American spoken word artists
American soul singers
West Coast hip hop musicians
21st-century American rappers
African-American songwriters
21st-century African-American musicians
Likwit Crew members